Milton Clark (27 June 1922 – 15 June 2018) was an Australian rules footballer who played with Essendon and North Melbourne in the Victorian Football League (VFL). 

Clark was on Essendon's list from 1939, but his football career was restricted due to his service in the armed forces during World War II. Clark played in Essendon's reserves premiership in 1941 and played three senior games for the Bombers in 1945. He transferred to North Melbourne for the 1946 where he played two further VFL matches. Clark later played for several season with Essendon RSL after leaving the VFL. He worked as a fibrous plasterer until retiring in 1982.

Notes

External links 

Essendon Football Club past player profile

1922 births
2018 deaths
Australian rules footballers from Melbourne
Essendon Football Club players
North Melbourne Football Club players
Australian Army personnel of World War II
Australian Army soldiers
People from Moonee Ponds, Victoria
Military personnel from Melbourne